Hot Buttered Rum (also known as Hot Buttered Rum String Band and HBRSB) is an American five-piece progressive bluegrass act based in the San Francisco Bay Area.

The group performs frequently at music festivals, including the Telluride Bluegrass Festival, Newport Folk Festival, South by Southwest, High Sierra Music Festival, Bonnaroo Music Festival, Grey Fox Bluegrass Festival, and Hardly Strictly Bluegrass Festival. They have also headlined The Fillmore in their home city of San Francisco and have performed with a wide array of artists, including Phil Lesh, Ben Harper, Chris Thile, Bela Fleck, Peter Rowan, and Bill Nershi.

Their song "Right Between Your Eyes" gained national prominence when it was selected to serve as the theme music for the TV show, "Cook's Country from America's Test Kitchen" during seasons one through 11.

Discography 
 Live at the Freight and Salvage (2002)
 (recorded live at Berkeley's premier listening venue The Freight and Salvage)
 Backrooms of My Mind
 Elephant Hunting Song
 Red-Haired Boy
 String's Breath
 The Trial of John Walker Lindh
 Norwegian Wood
 Warm Up
 Naked Blue
 Red Clay Halo
 The Crest
 In These Parts (2004)
 (HBR's first studio effort recorded in the hills of Fairfax, California)
 Three Point Two
 Flask, Alas!
 Evolution
 Old Dangerfield
 I've Let Go
 Lighten Up Your Load
 Horseshoe
 Reckless Tex
 Immaculate Rain
 In These Parts
 Well Oiled Machine (2006)
 Firefly
 Guns or Butter
 Idaho Pines
 Poison Oak
 Waterpocket Fold
 Always Be the Moon
 Well-Oiled Machine
 Waiting for a Squall
 Butch & Peggy
 Sweet Honey Fountain
 Wedding Day
 Live in the Northeast (2007)
Busted in Utah
Limbo in Lovelock
Desert Rat
Return Someday
Cumberland Blues
Metrosexual
Summertime Gal
California Snow & Rain
Spider
Queen Elizabeth
Honey Be
You Make Me Feel Like Dancing
 Limbs Akimbo (2010)
Two Loose Cannons
Something New
Beneath the Blossoms
A Great Many Things
Brokedown
Sexy Bakery Girl
Queen Elizabeth
Turning the Wheel
Honkytonk Tequila
Summertime Gal
Limbs Akimbo
 Live In The Sierra (2012)
Fruit of the Vine
Squall
Way Back When
Blue Moon Stars
Banished Set
Beyond the Sky
Ramblin' Girl
Be Kind Boys
Like the French
Loretta
Cody
Where the Streets Have No Name
Desert Rat
Lovelight
 Hot Buttered Rum (2014)
Working Man
Let the Love Come Through Me
Blackberry Pie
Another City
The Love You Gave Away
What Old Woman
Genie's Loose
The Crest
Mountain Song
Diamonds in the Wind
Every Side of the Coin
Doctor's Daughter
 Something Beautiful (2020)
Another Man's Song
Highway Sign
Something Beautiful
Good One Gone
What DO I Know
The Trial of John Walker Lindh
Lay Me Down a Pallet On Your Floor
Well-Oiled Machine
Church Is Where You Make It
Dovetail Joint
 Lonesome Panoramic (2021)
You Can Tell
Sittin’ Here Alone
Country Tunes & Love Songs
How Short the Song 3:27
Treasure Island Blues
Never Got Married
Spirits Still Come
Sleeping Giants
Leaving Dallas
When that Lonesome Feeling Comes
Mighty Fine
The One that Everybody Knows
The Deep End

Additional Associations:
The Overall Experience, Nat Keefe Concert Carnival and Erik Yates Project

References

External links 
Live music recordings (Archive.org)
Fan site and online database (www.morebutter.net)
Interactive fan site (www.hotbutteredrum.com)
photography from live shows available at www.gromfotos.com and www.deadesq.com
CLIF GreenNotes

American bluegrass music groups